Trifurcula hamirella is a moth of the  family Nepticulidae. It is found in the Mediterranean region from the Iberian Peninsula to Greece and in Algeria.

The larvae feed on Calamintha nepeta, Calamintha nepeta glandulosa, Calamintha sylvatica and Micromeria species. They mine the leaves of their host plant. The mine consists of a long, slender gallery with a narrow central frass line. Normally, the mine begins at the underside of a leaf, then descends along the petiole to the rind of the stem. Here a long gallery is made, either ascending or descending. Sometimes the mine is limited to the stem. Pupation takes place outside of the mine.

External links
bladmineerders.nl
Fauna Europaea

Nepticulidae
Moths of Europe
Moths of Africa
Moths described in 1915